The 2018 NCAA Division II men's basketball tournament is the 62nd annual single-elimination tournament to determine the national champion of men's NCAA Division II college basketball in the United States. Featuring sixty-four teams, it began on March 9, and concluded with the championship game on March 24.

The eight regional winners met in the Elite Eight for the quarterfinal, semifinal, and championship rounds. For the second consecutive year, the Elite Eight was held at the Sanford Pentagon in Sioux Falls, South Dakota.

Qualification
A total of 64 bids are available for each tournament: 24 automatic bids (awarded to the champions of the twenty-two Division II conferences) and 40 at-large bids.

The sixty-four bids are allocated evenly among the eight NCAA-designated regions (Atlantic, Central, East, Midwest, South, South Central, Southeast, and West), each of which contains three of the twenty-four Division II conferences that sponsor men's basketball. Each region consists of three automatic qualifiers (the teams who won their respective conference tournaments) and five at-large bids (which are awarded regardless of conference affiliation).

Five teams qualified for their first NCAA Division II tournament in 2018: Ohio Dominican, Point Loma Nazarene, Saint Martin's, Southern Nazarene, and West Florida.

Regionals

Atlantic – Petersburg, Virginia
Location: VSU Multi-Purpose Center

Central – Maryville, Missouri
Location: Bearcat Arena

East – Syracuse, New York
Location: Le Moyne Athletic Center

Midwest – Big Rapids, Michigan
Location: Jim Wink Arena

South – Atlanta, Georgia
Location: Forbes Arena

* – Denotes overtime period

Southeast – Harrogate, Tennessee
Location: B. Frank "Tex" Turner Arena

South Central – Canyon, Texas
Location: First United Bank Center

* – Denotes overtime period

West – Monmouth, Oregon
Location: WOU Physical Education Building

Elite Eight – Sioux Falls, South Dakota

References

NCAA Division II men's basketball tournament
Tournament
NCAA Division II basketball tournament
NCAA Division II basketball tournament
Basketball in Canyon, Texas